The North River is a tributary of the Cacapon River, belonging to the Potomac River and Chesapeake Bay watersheds. The river is located in Hampshire and Hardy counties in the U.S. state of West Virginia's Eastern Panhandle. The mouth of the North River into the Cacapon is located at Forks of Cacapon. From its headwaters to its mouth, the North River spans  in length.

Headwaters and course

South Branch Mountain to Rio 
The North River's headwaters comprise two streams that converge in the southeastern hollows of South Branch Mountain (3028 ft) in Hardy County. From its source, the river flows east through the communities of Inkerman and Rock Oak along North River Road (County Route 1) where it is joined by Grassy Lick Run. The North River continues to flow east as a shallow stony stream and after it passes through a gap in Short Mountain (2864 ft), it acts as the border between Hardy and Hampshire counties. It is in this stretch that the river is home to the Rio Turtle, a large turtle-shaped rock painted to resemble a turtle. The river then enters exclusively into Hampshire County where it meets the community of Rio and Sperry Run, which flows in from the south.

Rio to Forks of Cacapon

At Rio (pronounced RYE-O), the North River makes a ninety-degree bend and flows north into the wide fertile North River Valley along North River Mountain (2149 ft). Also beginning at Rio, the North River parallels West Virginia Route 29 (Delray Road). On its journey northward, the river is fed from the west by Deep Run and Mick Run, which drain off of Short Mountain. Further north along WV 29, the river passes through the communities of Delray and Sedan at Pearl Ridge (1302 ft). Departing from Sedan, the North River flows under the Northwestern Turnpike (U.S. Route 50) at Hanging Rock and winds its  way northward around North River Mountain. Pine Draft Run and Tearcoat Creek join the river south of Hoy before the river bends yet again and joins Gibbons Run. Flowing through the historic village of North River Mills, the river is joined by Hiett's Run, which flows from the eastern side of Ice Mountain (1489 ft). After North River Mills, the river makes a sharp linear curve around the Devil's Backbone (856 ft) and then commences its movement northward along Pine Mountain (1726 ft). The North River crosses under the Bloomery Pike (West Virginia Route 127) and is then joined from the west by Crooked Run before flowing under Gaston Road's one-lane bridge and finally arriving at its confluence with the Cacapon River at Forks of Cacapon.

History
Since the early settlement of Hampshire County, the North River had been considered unnavigable by locals and experts alike.

Gallery

Bridges

Tributaries

Tributary streams are listed in order from south (source) to north (mouth).

Skaggs Run
Pot Lick Run
Horn Camp Run
Waterlick Run
Grassy Lick Run
Meadow Run
Sperry Run
Deep Run
Lick Run
Elkhorn Run
Hanging Rock Run
Stuart Hollow Run
Henderson Hollow Run
Pine Draft Run
Tearcoat Creek
Turkeyfoot Run
Bearwallow Creek
Gibbons Run
Maple Run
Hiett Run
Riggs Hollow Run
Crooked Run
Castle Run

List of cities and towns along the North River

Delray
Forks of Cacapon
Hanging Rock
Hoy
Inkerman
North River Mills
Rio
Rock Oak
Sedan

See also
List of rivers of West Virginia

References

External links

Rivers of Hampshire County, West Virginia
Rivers of Hardy County, West Virginia
Rivers of West Virginia
Tributaries of the Potomac River